The International Subarachnoid Aneurysm Trial (ISAT) was a large multicentre, prospective randomised clinical medical trial, comparing the safety and efficacy of endovascular coil treatment and surgical clipping for the treatment of brain aneurysms. The study began in 1994. The first results were published in The Lancet in 2002, and the 10 year data were published again in The Lancet in early September 2005. 2,143 study participants were mostly drawn from U.K. hospitals with the rest drawn from North American and European hospitals.

The study found better results with endovascular coil treatment compared to surgical clipping, however subsequent studies have questioned this conclusion. The study was criticised by many clinicians and not well accepted by surgeons. Primary criticisms were related to the study's patient population's generalisability to the wider population, and the long-term prognosis of coil embolisation.

Study design and results
ISAT sought to measure outcomes of cerebral aneurysm patients at 2 and 12 months using a type of a Rankin scale. The study was halted in 2002 after the oversight committee found increased morbidity with clipping over endovascular coiling.

Criticism
ISAT was criticised on a number of factors, many related to the randomization of the patient population. The patient population was on average younger, and the majority had aneurysms under 10 mm and in anterior circulation. The randomized patient population in the ISAT was younger on average than the population of subarachnoid hemorrhage patients in the U.S. and Japan. In response to these criticisms a facility that participated in ISAT compared the clinical outcomes of their patients that were not selected for the study to those that were. They reported finding outcomes similar to the ISAT.

Subsequent analysis
Although the initial ISAT analysis appeared to favor endovascular coiling over microsurgical clipping, subsequent meta-analysis have questioned that conclusion, finding higher incidences of recurrence. A large meta-analysis from Johns Hopkins University published in Neurosurgery concluded that "there is no clear consensus in these two studies or in the 45 observational studies included."

Updated data from the ISAT group in March 2008 shows that the higher aneurysm rate of recurrence is also associated with a higher rebleeding rate, given that the rebleed rate of coiled aneurysms appears to be 8 times higher than that of clipping treated aneurysms in this study. The ISAT authors conclude that "when treating ruptured cerebral aneurysms, the advantage of coil embolization over clip ligation cannot be assumed for patients < 40 years old." Other subsequent studies have questioned the ISAT's conclusions directly. This conclusion is based on a number of methodological assumptions itself and other authors have cautioned about extending it to other patient populations.

It appears that although endovascular coiling is associated with a shorter recovery period as compared to surgical clipping, it is also associated with a significantly higher recurrence rate after treatment. The long-term data for unruptured aneurysms are still being gathered.

See also 
 Cerebral aneurysm
 Subarachnoid hemorrhage

References

Neurosurgery
Radiology